The 1989 Southern Illinois Salukis football team was an American football team that represented Southern Illinois University (now known as Southern Illinois University Carbondale) in the Gateway Collegiate Athletic Conference (GCAC) during the 1989 NCAA Division I-AA football season.  Under first-year head coach Bob Smith, the team compiled a 2–9 record (1–5 against conference opponents) and tied for sixth place in the conference. The team played its home games at McAndrew Stadium in Carbondale, Illinois. 

The Salukis' game against  began on September 9 but was suspended in the first quarter due to lightning. The game was completed the following day.

Schedule

References

Southern Illinois
Southern Illinois Salukis football seasons
Southern Illinois Salukis football